Kerry Woollen Mills are historic wool mills based just off the Ring of Kerry.

History 

Kerry Woollen Mills are one of the last remaining traditional wool mills still manufacturing in County Kerry. The company was founded over 300 years ago. The mill's machinery was originally driven by the River Gweestin, and its water was also used for washing and dying the wool. The mill was run by the Sealy family for many generations since its inception in 1760, and brought into the capable hands of the Eadie family in 1904, who had gained experience in the wool manufacturing business for many years in Fermanagh and Scotland and are now successfully managing the mill in the fourth generation. Wool is spun, dyed and woven on the premises at the back of a well-stocked showroom, where yarns and the finished products are displayed.

The mill is set in a rural location with many of historic buildings still being used. The machinery is a successful blend of the traditional and modern, having been carefully updated over the years. Now, the company focuses on supplying its products in traditional colours and designs to niche markets around the world. Visitors have the opportunity to see the carding, spinning, weaving and finishing of natural fibre textiles and fashion products such as scarves, shawls, tweeds, speciality blankets and rugs. The Mill supplies its products to a large and loyal customer base in four principal segments: Manufacturers of clothing and headwear from the British Isles buy tweed, hotels and guesthouses order bespoke blankets, retail shops in Ireland and overseas buy the products to sell them to end customers and finally there is a need for speciality products e.g. in the equestrian industry. The mills sell also through their own outlet shops directly to the public, mainly to American tourists.

External links 

 www.kerrywoollenmills.ie (official website)
 Nationwide visits the historical Kerry Woollen Mills (YouTube video)
 A Visit to Kerry Woollen Mills with Micheál O Muircheartaigh (YouTube video)

References 

Woollen mills
County Kerry
Textile companies of Ireland